Kiasmos is the 2014 debut album by the Icelandic minimal experimental techno duo Kiasmos, composed of Ólafur Arnalds and Janus Rasmussen. It was released on 27 October 2014 on Erased Tapes Records.

Reception

Upon release, the album received critical acclaim. At Metacritic, which assigns a normalised rating out of 100 to reviews from mainstream critics, the album has received a score of 86, based on 5 reviews, which is categorized as "Universal acclaim".

Track listing

References

External links
 

Kiasmos albums
2014 albums
Erased Tapes Records albums